Unleash the Beast is Saxon's thirteenth studio album, released in 1997.  It is the first studio album with Doug Scarratt on guitar, making it the first album to feature the band's current lineup as of 2022.

Track listing
All tracks written by Biff Byford, Nibbs Carter, Nigel Glockler, Paul Quinn, and Doug Scarratt, except where noted.

Personnel 
 Biff Byford - vocals
 Doug Scarratt - guitar
 Paul Quinn - guitar
 Nibbs Carter - bass guitar
 Nigel Glockler - drums

Production
 Kalle Trapp - producer, mixing
 Saxon - producer
 Karo Studios, Brackel, Germany - recording and mixing location
 Biff Byford - mixing

Charts

References

Saxon (band) albums
1997 albums
CMC International albums
Virgin Records albums